Atenia is a genus of air-breathing land snails, terrestrial pulmonate gastropod mollusks in the family Helicodontidae.

Species
Species within the genus Atenia include:
 Atenia quadrasi (Hidalgo, 1885)

References

 Gittenberger, E. (1968). Zur Systematik der in die Gattung Trissexodon Pilsbry (Helicidae, Helicodontinae) gerechneten Arten. Zoologische Mededelingen. 43 (13): 166-172. Leiden.
 Gittenberger, E. (1968). Zur Systematik der in die Gattung Trissexodon Pilsbry (Helicidae, Helicodontinae) gerechneten Arten. Zoologische Mededelingen. 43 (13): 166-172. Leiden.

 
Helicodontidae